Thizzelle Washington is the seventh full-length album by the late Bay Area rapper Mac Dre. Released in 2002, this album introduced the "Thizzle Dance", based on the track of the same name.

Track listing 
"Intro" - 1:37 (featuring Yukmouth)
"Monday Thru Sunday" (featuring Syko) - 4:23
"Stuart Littles" - 3:30
"Help Me" - 4:31 (featuring Freako, Rydah J. Klyde)
"The Mac Named Dre" - 4:26
"Dam I Used to Know That (Interlude)" - 2:07
"Boss Tycoon" - 4:12 (featuring Yukmouth)
"4 Myself" - 4:05 (featuring Devious, Dubee)
"C.U.T.T.H.O.A.T." - 4:37 (featuring Cutthoat Committee)
"Han Solo" - 3:37 (featuring Syko)
"Rap Life" - 4:06 (featuring Sleep Dank)
"Thizzle Dance" - 4:04 (featuring Chuck Beez)
"Soom Lama (Interlude)" - 2:52
"Big Breaded" - 4:25 (featuring Luni Coleone)
"Dollalalala Lotsa Paypa" - 3:12 (featuring KC Bobcat, Sauce)
"Miss You" - 3:19

References

2002 albums
Mac Dre albums
Thizz Entertainment albums